Rolf de Heer (born 4 May 1951) is a Dutch Australian film director. De Heer was born in Heemskerk in the Netherlands but migrated to Sydney when he was eight years old. He attended the Australian Film, Television and Radio School in Sydney. His company is called Vertigo Productions and is based in Adelaide. De Heer primarily makes alternative or arthouse films. According to the jacket notes of the videotape, de Heer holds the honor of co-producing and directing the only motion picture, Dingo, in which the jazz legend Miles Davis appears as an actor. Miles Davis collaborated with Michel Legrand on the score. He is the subject of the book Dutch Tilt, Aussie Auteur: The Films of Rolf de Heer (First edition – Saarbrücken, Germany: VDM, 2009. Second edition – Ebook: Starrs via Smashwords.com, 2013) by Dr D. Bruno Starrs. A comprehensive study of his films to date, Dancing to His Song: the Singular Cinema of Rolf de Heer by film critic Jane Freebury, is published in ebook and print (Currency Press & Currency House, 2015).

His 2013 film Charlie's Country was selected to compete in the Un Certain Regard section at the 2014 Cannes Film Festival.

Awards and nominations

Charlie's Country
 2014 AACTA Award for Best Film - nominated
 2014 AACTA Award for Best Direction - nominated
 2014 AACTA Award for Best Original Screenplay - nominated
 Cannes Film Festival – nominated for "Un Certain Regard"
 2013 Adelaide Film Festival - won the Audience Award for Most Popular Feature

Ten Canoes
 2006 Cannes Film Festival – winner of "Un Certain Regard" – Special Jury Prize
 2006 Flanders International Film Festival – winner of the Grand Prix, shared with Peter Djigirr
 2006 Australian Film Institute Awards:
 winner for Best Direction, shared with Peter Djigirr
 winner for Best Film, (with producer Julie Ryan)
 winner for Best Original Screenplay
 2006 Film Critics Circle of Australia Awards
 2006 IF Awards – winner of the award for Best Director, with Peter Djigirr
 2006 winner of the NSW History Awards, The Premier's Audio/Visual History Prize

The Tracker
 2002 Venice Film Festival – SIGNIS Award – Honorable Mention
 2002 Flanders International Film Festival – winner of Best Screenplay Award
 2002 Valladolid International Film Festival – winner Jury Special Prize
 2002 IF Awards – winner Best Feature Film (with producer Julie Ryan)

Bad Boy Bubby
 1993 Venice Film Festival – Special Jury Prize
 1994 Australian Film Institute (AFI) awards:
 winner for Best Director
 winner for Best Original Screenplay

Filmography
 Tail of a Tiger (1984)
 Thank You Jack (1985) (TV)
 Incident at Raven's Gate (1988)
 Dingo (1991)
 Bad Boy Bubby (1993)
 The Quiet Room (1996)
 Epsilon (1997)
 Dance Me to My Song (1998)
 The Sound of One Hand Clapping (1998) (producer)
 Spank (1999) (producer)
 The Old Man Who Read Love Stories (2000)
 The Tracker (2002)
 Alexandra's Project (2003)
 Ten Canoes (2006)
 The Balanda and the Bark Canoes (2006) (TV)
 Dr. Plonk (2007)
 Twelve Canoes (2008)
 The King Is Dead! (2012)
 Charlie's Country (2013)
 The Survival of Kindness (2022)

See also
 List of Australian films

Notes

References
 2006 NSW Premier’s History Awards & Fellowships Arts NSW, (Retrieved 17 July 2007)
 Awards for Rolf de Heer IMDb, (Retrieved 28 July 2007)

External links

Vertigo Website
12 Canoes is the follow-up to Ten Canoes, made in collaboration with the Yolngu people of Ramingining and released only on the internet.

1951 births
Living people
Australian film directors
Australian film producers
Heer, Rolf de
Heer, Rolf de
English-language film directors
Australian Film Television and Radio School alumni